The name Muifa (Cantonese and Macanese: ) has been used for four tropical cyclones in the western north Pacific Ocean. Submitted by Macau, the name is the Cantonese name for the plum blossom.

 Typhoon Muifa (2004) (T0425, 29W, Unding) – struck the Philippines and Vietnam.
 Typhoon Muifa (2011) (T1109, 11W, Kabayan) – approached Japan, China and Korea.
 Tropical Storm Muifa (2017) (T1701, 03W, Dante) — never made landfall.
 Typhoon Muifa (2022) (T2212, 14W, Inday) a typhoon which hit Taiwan, China and Korea.

Pacific typhoon set index articles